UBG may refer to:

Unabhängige Bürger Gauting
University of Bahr El-Ghazal
Utama Banking Group
Universidade Bagual Gaucha